UgunsGrēks is a Latvian daytime soap opera that was broadcast on TV3 Latvia from 2009 until 2017. It was one of the longest-running scripted television programs in Latvia, airing nearly every weekday from March 15, 2009. It last aired on 19 May 2017. UgunsGrēks is the sequel to the LTV1 show The Cost of Frenzy (Latvian: Neprāta cena). After a 5 year break, the show got renewed for another season. It was confirmed on April 11th, 2022. The show is available to watch on the streaming platform Go3 since October 10th, 2022, but it will air February 13th on TV.

The show was created by Inta Gorodecka and Baiba Saleniece. The show's storylines were written by Inta Bernova and Gunta Kalniņa. The program featured an ensemble cast, headed by its longest-serving actors Ģirts Ķesteris as Leons Timmermanis, Jakovs Rafalsons as Vadims Felzenbahers, Zane Daudziņa as Helene Felzenbahere, Ilze Vazdika as Milda Upīte, Egīls Melnbārdis as Gunārs Liepiņš, Uldis Dumpis as Aivars Pētersons and Regīna Devīte as Zenta Upīte. In 2014, the show was the most-watched soap opera in Latvia, with an audience of an estimated 1 762 000 viewers. The series ended in May 2017 and was replaced  by Svešā seja as a new day time soap opera, which was produced by the same creative team.

Seasons

History 
The storyline began in 2006 with another series called The Cost of Frenzy (Latvian: Neprāta cena). In March 2009 only ten days before the expected series premiere, TV3 Latvia came out with a disclaimer that The Cost of Frenzy would no longer be broadcast on the LTV1 network and would now be shown on TV3 Latvia with its new name UgunsGrēks. The new series brought new characters and multiple storylines over the years.

UgunsGrēks ended on May 19, 2017. After 17 seasons, the show's creators decided that it was time for the show to end. UgunsGrēks final episode was 2 hours long and after that TV3 Latvia showed special live broadcast from the casts after party with actors from all the seasons. The creative team began to work on a new daily soap opera called Svešā seja, which premiered on September 18, 2017, in the same time slot that UgunsGrēks had aired. Svešā seja did not find the same success that UgunsGrēks had received, and was cancelled less than a year later on May 17, 2018, only ever airing 2 seasons.

Storyline 

When UgunsGrēks premiered in 2009, the TV series revolved around the tragedies and triumphs of the Pētersons family, their friends and enemies in little city near the sea where the Pētersons family-owned a hotel. Storylines in the show followed the lives of residents of the Peterson hotel with the usual threads of love, marriage, divorce, family life, and the intrigue of the resort's ownership.

Over time, new families with their own hotels were brought to the show to interact with the Peterson family and serve as competitors for more dramatic storylines. One of the longest-running storylines involved a doctor named Leon, his love life and happiness. From the beginning until the 9th season of the series Leon was the main leading male character in Ugunsgrēks. This plot-line was made even more complex when the love of his life Marta Peterson played by Dita Lūriņa was killed in the bomb explosion. After this accident, Leon was left blind and alone. The 9th Season he finally found his true love and married his love interest for 4 seasons – Elizabete Ziemele played by Maija Doveika. After this, Leon went to Germany and his storyline ended.

With Leon's storyline ending, the viewers were reintroduced with Leons daughter Ieva Timmermane now played by Inga Tropa. Ieva became even more involved in the storyline as the series showed the audience Āboltiņi family who had built a new hotel Mare SPA near the Peterson resort. A love triangle between Ieva, a son from the Āboliņi family and Viesturs, Aivars friend and his firm bought the hotel after Dana stole it from Ieva, in order to save the son she had to choose between. Their love triangle lasted for 3 seasons. The story-line ended in the 14th season when Aivars offered Ieva to go back to England and she did, so in result, she chose none of them.

Cast 
When UgunsGrēks debuted, the cast consisted of six main characters (Leons Timmermanis, Marta Pētersone, Aivars Pētersons, Oto Pētersons, Elza Timmermane, Rihards Baumanis). As the show continued, the cast increased to 12 actors, and more over the next years. Throughout the show's run, there were over 200 actors that had a role in the TV series. Ģirts Ķesteris is seen in most of the episodes, because he has been in the show from the beginning.

Original cast member Mārtiņs Freimanis who played Oto Pētersons remained on contract with Ugunsgrēks until his sudden death on 27 January 2011. In the series, Martiņš Freimanis' character, Oto moved to England and was never heard from again.

Cast member Ģirts Ķesteris holds the record for appearing in the most episodes since the beginning of the series. The actor played two roles: Leons Timmernanis, the hotel doctor, and the role of his long lost twin brother Fēlikss Seņkovs from Russia.

In last years of UgunsGrēks casting director hired many new cast member to appeal to their younger viewers. The new cast members were Vanda Saulīte (Dārta Daneviča), Signe Kļaviņa (Anta Aizupe), Sandija (Marija Linarte) Olafs Birznieks, (Gints Andžāns).

Executive producing and head writing team 

 The co-creator and original executive producer- Baiba Saleniece 
 Director- Inta Gorodecka 
 The first long-term head writer- Gunta Kalniņa, Inta Bernova and Vilnis Bīriņš

Domestic broadcast 
According to MTG TV LATVIA, UgunsGrēks was the most widely distributed soap opera and TV show in Latvia with episodes not just broadcast via TV3 Latvia, but also via Kanals2 and as of June 2012, episodes were offered via TV3play.

Related shows

The Cost of Frenzy 
This series aired four days of the week and consisted of 5 main characters (Aurēlija Anužīte as Anna Pētersone, Juris Žagarsas Roberts, Ģirts Ķesteris as Leons Timmermanis, Kristīne Nevarauska as Līga, Jakovs Rafalsons as Vadims Felzenbahers.

Zenta's holidays 
This mini-series sitcom was shown on TV3 from 2013 August to October 2013. The series follows a character from UgunsGrēks, the hotel's maid Zenta Upīte, on her holidays. The cast consisted of Indra Burkovska (Dainuvīte), Baiba Neja (Dace), Ivars Kļavinskis (Zigis), Andris Bērziņš (Gastons) and Sergejs Čerņikovs (policeman).

Christmas special 
In Christmas of 2016, the cast of UgunsGrēks surprised their fans by releasing a Christmas special event. This special featured all of the major characters from the 16th season - Aivars, Milda, Lidija, Krista, Dāvids, Jezups, Magda, Intars, Sandija, Gunārs, Helēna, Fēlikss, Jevgēņija, Dana and Gatis. All the characters participated in Christmas activities – baking gingerbread, decorating a Christmas tree and performing. The special aired at 8.00 pm on TV3 Latvia.

Opening title sequences and theme song 
The opening title sequences were different nearly every season from the show's debut in 2009, however there have been only 3 theme songs. The first title sequence of UgunsGrēks featured all characters from season one and the Martiņš Freimanis song "Mans neatklātais super NLO." The second season started with a different sequence, but the same theme song by Martiņš Freimanis. In the next years, the characters changed but the concept of the opening titles stayed the same, although the theme songs were different. From the third season to the ninth, the theme song "Tici vai nē" was performed by Kārlis Būmeisters. For the next five seasons the opening song Divi vēji was written and performed by Gunārs Kalniņš. In the last two UgunsGrēks had their theme song written and performed by Latvian pop singer Dons.

External links 
 Official home page (Latvian)
 Watch the show online (with ads)
 Watch the show online (with a subscription, no ads]

References 

Television in Latvia
Latvian television series
TV3 (Latvia) original programming